Aloha College is a private school established in 1982 as a not-for-profit in Marbella, Spain. It provides an international education in 2 sections, Primary School (3 – 10 years) and Secondary School (11 – 18 years). 

The main building, purpose-built in 1982, houses the Primary school and administration department and covers an area of 5000 square metres. When it opened it was one of the first IB schools in Spain. A new Secondary school was opened in September 2004, effectively doubling the size of the school. The modern, purpose-built accommodation has, in addition to normal classroom provision, seven well-equipped laboratories, three dedicated computer suites, a library & media Centre, two art & design Studios and a Music Department with a tiered performance area and two drama studios. There are two all-weather sports pitches, a golfing academy and riding school nearby and daily use is made of tennis and swimming facilities within minutes of the site.

In addition to a wide-ranging programme of extra-curricular activities, there is a strong emphasis on music and drama tuition. Aloha College is an official examination centre for the prestigious LAMDA qualifications (London Academy of Music and Dramatic Art). Also, examiners from the Associated Board of the Royal Schools of Music and the British Ballet Organization regularly visit the college to assess pupils. Students from 14 years onwards have the opportunity of taking part in the Duke of Edinburgh Award Scheme.

See also
 Instituto Español Vicente Cañada Blanch - Spanish international school in London
 British migration to Spain

References

1982 establishments in Spain
Buildings and structures in Marbella
Educational institutions established in 1982
Elementary and primary schools in Spain
Private schools in Spain
Secondary schools in Spain
Schools in Andalusia